The Tramweg Maatschappij De Graafschap was a  gauge steam tram that operated over  between Zutphen, Warnsveld and Hengelo, Gelderland in the Netherlands. The tramway opened in 1889, and was taken over by the Geldersche Stoomtramweg Maatschappij in 1939.

See also 
 Narrow-gauge railways in the Netherlands

References 

Steam trams in the Netherlands
750 mm gauge railways in the Netherlands